The Native is the name of a fictional character appearing in American comic books published by Marvel Comics.

Publication history
Native first appeared in Wolverine vol. 3 #13 and was created by Greg Rucka and Darick Robertson.

Fictional character biography
The Native was captured by the Weapon X program, the same program that gave the X-Men's Wolverine his adamantium skeleton. The scientists working there gave her the codename of "Feral." When Wolverine escaped from the organization, so did the Native. Wolverine and the Native spent some time together in a cabin on the hills of British Columbia, where they became lovers for some time. It's unclear why Wolverine left the Native.

Trying to survive, the Native's presence was rediscovered years later by an offshoot of the Weapon X program led by Mr. Willoughby. Sabretooth was brought in by Mr. Willoughby to track and retrieve her with the help of the hunters Bowen and Peary. Sabretooth tracked her down, only for her to kill Bowen and Peary, outfight Sabretooth, and flee. Sabretooth then manipulated Wolverine into finding her upon visiting him in a bar in Montana. When Wolverine found Native, she shared a romantic interlude with him. Wolverine and the Native were tracked by soldiers from the Weapon X offshoot who immobilized him and captured the Native, whom they brought to The Workshop facility in Montana.

While in captivity of the Weapon X offshoot, the Native was operated on by Doctor Vapor, who removed genetic material from her to be sold to other parties and discovered that the Native's accelerated physiology had resulted in a pregnancy from her liaison with Wolverine. Wolverine killed Doctor Vapor and left with the Native. However, the pair were watched by Sabretooth who promised to finish what he started. Tracking the couple, Sabretooth revealed Native's condition, defeated Wolverine and subsequently killed the Native which also resulted in the death of their unborn child. Logan wakes up and tracks Native once again to find her corpse. It had a note written in her blood from Victor Creed, saying: "I did you a favor runt - you can thank me later." Wolverine is reduced to tears.

He needs a priest for Native's funeral, so he meets up with his old friend Nightcrawler at a bar after hours. He carries Native in and Nightcrawler reads the last rites for her and their unborn child.

Powers and abilities
The Native was a mutant who possessed a healing factor that allows her to recover from even the most severe wounds with remarkable speed. She also possessed superhumanly acute senses, as well as having sufficient superhuman strength and ferocity to allow her to successfully subdue an opponent over twice her size. The Native's physiology was also accelerated to the extent that her body could conceive and gestate a fetus within a matter of hours. Despite the extent of her healing factor, the Native was not immortal.

References

External links
 Native at Marvel.com
 Native at Marvel Wiki
 Native at Comic Vine

Fictional characters with superhuman senses
Marvel Comics mutants
Marvel Comics characters with accelerated healing
Marvel Comics characters with superhuman strength
Characters created by Greg Rucka